Papa Alassane Ndiaye (born 15 March 1993) is a Senegalese footballer who plays as a defender.

Football career
On 13 August 2014, Ndiaye made his professional debut with Trofense in a 2014–15 Taça da Liga match against Atlético.

References

External links

Stats and profile at LPFP 

1993 births
Living people
Senegalese footballers
Association football defenders
Senegalese expatriate footballers
Expatriate footballers in Portugal
C.D. Trofense players
Liga Portugal 2 players